Marcelo Damián Ortiz (born 13 January 1994) is an Argentine professional footballer who plays as a centre-back.

Career
Ortiz started off with Primera B Nacional's Boca Unidos, who loaned him out during the 2012–13 campaign to Comunicaciones of Torneo Argentino B. He made twenty-two appearances for Comunicaciones before returning to his parent club. Boca Unidos subsequently gave Ortiz his professional football debut in December 2013 during a Primera B Nacional home draw over San Martín, having previously been an unused substitute three times between the 2011–12 and 2012–13 seasons. He then made one hundred and ten further appearances in the following years between 2014 and 2017.

On 5 August 2017, Ortiz joined Argentine Primera División side Rosario Central on loan. His Primera División debut arrived on 26 August versus Colón.

Career statistics
.

Honours
Rosario Central
Copa Argentina: 2017–18

References

External links

1994 births
Living people
People from Corrientes
Argentine footballers
Association football defenders
Primera Nacional players
Torneo Argentino B players
Argentine Primera División players
Boca Unidos footballers
Club Comunicaciones (Mercedes) footballers
Rosario Central footballers
Atlético Tucumán footballers
Sportspeople from Corrientes Province